The Cornell School District is a public school district in Cornell, Wisconsin.

References

External links
 

Education in Chippewa County, Wisconsin
School districts in Wisconsin